Tiracola is a genus of moths of the family Noctuidae.

Species
 Tiracola aureata Holloway, 1989
 Tiracola circularis (Holloway, 1979)
 Tiracola grandirena (Herrich-Schäffer, 1868)
 Tiracola lilacea Dognin, 1914
 Tiracola magusina Draudt, 1950
 Tiracola minima Prout, 1926
 Tiracola nonconformens Dyar, 1918
 Tiracola plagiata (Walker, 1857)
 Tiracola rufimargo Warren, 1912
 Tiracola tabwemasana Holloway, 1979
 Tiracola versicolor Prout, 1922

References
Natural History Museum Lepidoptera genus database
Tiracola at funet

Hadeninae